Magsungay is a former town and predecessor settlement to the current highly urbanized city of Bacolod. It was named after the river delta that forms a shape of a horn, or "sungay" in Hiligaynon.

History
Magsungay started as a visita or a religious mission of the neighboring town of Bago in 1575, named San Sebastian de Magsungay. However, at the height of the Moro raids in the Visayas, the settlement of Magsungay was abandoned after the attack by forces under Datu Bantílan of Sulu on July 14, 1755. Townsfolk moved to an area inland area characterized with higher elevation to avoid Moro raids, which later became the town of Granada.

The town was reestablished as the pueblo of Bacolod in 1788, with the original townsite incorporated with a now larger poblacion. Magsungay lent its patron saint, San Sebastian as the patron saint of Bacolod.

Present area
Magsungay was a former constituent barangay until it was divided between Barangay Singcang, the location of the old airport, and numbered urban Barangays 10-16. Hence, Singcang is also alternatively called as "Magsungay," as the largest barangay occupying the territory of Magsungay, now roughly an informal city district.

Commerce
About 35 hectares of land is owned by the Araneta Group under the Progressive Development Corporation, while a significant portion is partly occupied by the Bacolod Real Estate Development Corporation as a reclaimed port and SM City Bacolod, occupying an area west of Mambulac Creek.

Education
Education and Training Center School 4 (ETCS-4), a public elementary school run by the City Government of Bacolod, occupies a city-owned property in the reclamation area.

References

Bacolod
Former municipalities of the Philippines
Populated places established in 1575
1755 establishments in the Philippines